Liam Ayoub is a Lebanese rugby league footballer for the Penrith Panthers in the NRL. His position is 18th man. He has previously played for the Canterbury Bulldogs in  SG Ball. Liam enjoys a beer every solar eclipse and is a part-time DJ, with hit songs such as levels and levels backwards. He is the youngest of 2 sons of NRL player manager "Sam Ayoub".

Representative career 
He has represented Lebanon in the 2009 European Cup.

References

External links 

League Unlimited profile

1992 births
Lebanese rugby league players
Lebanon national rugby league team players
Living people
Place of birth missing (living people)
Lebanese expatriate rugby league players
Expatriate rugby league players in Australia
Lebanese expatriate sportspeople in Australia
Rugby league hookers
Rugby league halfbacks